Westward is a civil parish in the Borough of Allerdale in Cumbria, England.  It contains 38 listed buildings that are recorded in the National Heritage List for England.  Of these, four are listed at Grade II*, the middle of the three grades, and the others are at Grade II, the lowest grade.  The parish contains the villages of Westward, West Curthwaite, East Curthwaite, and Rosley, and is otherwise rural.  Most of the listed buildings are houses, farmhouses and farm buildings; the other listed buildings include a church, public houses, milestones, a hotel, a water tower, a war memorial, and a reservoir inspection chamber.


Key

Buildings

References

Citations

Sources

Lists of listed buildings in Cumbria